Keria Gula Melaka is a type of doughnuts that made of sweet potato and slicked with smoky gula Melaka, Malaysian palm sugar.
 
It is usually served during breakfast or teatime.

See also

 Cuisine of Malaysia

References

External links
 Keria Gula Melaka Recipe

Malay cuisine
Snack foods